The Center Road – Tittabawassee River Bridge was a bridge carrying Center Road over the Tittabawassee River in James Township, Michigan. It was listed on the National Register of Historic Places in 1999.

History
In 1926, the Michigan State Highway Department designed this bridge located on the Tittabawassee River. The department contracted with Willits Brothers Construction Co. of Bay City. Willits completed the bridge in 1927, using a steel superstructure constructed by the American Bridge Company. The bridge functioned in place until the 21st century. Although the bridge was still functional, the bridge was demolished in November 2009.

Description
The Center Road Bridge was a multiple-span bridge constructed of concrete and steel. The bridge had five steel stringer spans, each 65 feet long. Each span contained nine lines of rolled I-beams supported by concrete abutments and piers. The outside webs of the spandrel stringers were encased in concrete. Atop the stringers was a concrete deck with standard concrete guardrails on each side, having classical fluted balusters and paneled bulkheads.

References

External links
Images of the bridge from HistoricBridges.com

		
National Register of Historic Places in Saginaw County, Michigan
Infrastructure completed in 1927